Melvin Robert (Bob) Haukoos (June 21, 1931 –  September 10, 2011) was a Minnesota politician and was a member of the Minnesota House of Representatives from 1979-1995.  Haukoos, a Republican, who represented District 27A, which included all or portions of Freeborn and Mower counties in the southeastern part of the state.  Haukoos also served as the Mayor of Albert Lea, Minnesota from 2001-2002.

Early life, education, and career
Born in Walters, Minnesota to Russell and Emma Hauskins Haukoos, Haukoos attended Kiester-Walters Public Schools.  He enlisted in the Naval Reserve and was called to active duty in 1950. During the Korean War, he served on the flight decks of the aircraft carriers  and the  operating off the coast of Korea. After the war he became a firefighter for the Albert Lea, Minnesota Fire Department. He served on the fire department for 21  1/2 years, retiring as captain of the blue shift.

Minnesota House of Representatives

Elections
Haukoos was first elected to the House on November 7, 1978, he was re-elected in 1980, 1982, 1984, 1986, 1988, 1990, and 1992.  In 1994 he decided to retire from the legislature.

Committee assignments
For the 78th Legislative Session, Haukoos was part of the:
Commerce and Economic Development Committee
Commerce and Economic Development Subcommittee: International Trade, Technology and Economic Development Division 
Commerce and Economic Development Subcommittee: Occupational Licensing 
General Legislation, Veterans Affairs, and Elections Committee
Governmental Operations and Gambling Committee
Governmental Operations and Gambling Subcommittee: Gambling 
Governmental Operations and Gambling Subcommittee: State Government Finance Division

For the 77th Legislative Session, Haukoos was part of the:
Appropriations Committee
Appropriations Subcommittee: Education Division 
Financial Institutions and Insurance Committee
Financial Institutions and Insurance Subcommittee: Banking Division 
Redistricting Committee
Regulated Industries Committee

For the 76th Legislative Session, Haukoos was part of the:
Governmental Operations Committee
Governmental Operations Subcommittee: Government Structures 
Insurance Committee
Local Government and Metropolitan Affairs Committee
Local Government and Metropolitan Affairs Subcommittee: Local Government and Structures 
Regulated Industries Committee

For the 75th Legislative Session, Haukoos was part of the:
Appropriations Committee
Appropriations Subcommittee: Education Division 
Future and Technology Committee
Future and Technology Subcommittee: Futurist 
Future and Technology Subcommittee: Software 
Local and Urban Affairs Committee
Transportation Committee
Transportation Subcommittee: Safety

For the 74th Legislative Session, Haukoos was part of the:
Appropriations Committee
Appropriations Subcommittee: Education Division (Chair) 
Financial Institutions and Insurance Committee
Local and Urban Affairs Committee
Local and Urban Affairs Subcommittee: Local Government Affairs

For the 73rd Legislative Session, Haukoos was part of the:
Appropriations Committee
Appropriations Subcommittee: Education Division 
Financial Institutions and Insurance Committee
Financial Institutions and Insurance Subcommittee: Insurance 
Local and Urban Affairs Committee
Local and Urban Affairs Subcommittee: Physical and Economic Development

For the 72nd Legislative Session, Haukoos was part of the:
Appropriations Committee
Appropriations Subcommittee: Education Division 
Local and Urban Affairs Committee
Local and Urban Affairs Subcommittee: Physical Development 
Reapportionment and Elections Committee
Reapportionment and Elections Subcommittee: Election Laws

For the 71st Legislative Session, Haukoos was part of the:
Appropriations Committee
Appropriations Subcommittee: Education Division 
General Legislation and Veterans Affairs Committee
General Legislation and Veterans Affairs Subcommittee: Elections and Campaign Practices

Tenure
Haukoos was first sworn in on January 3, 1979, serving until January 3, 1995.  He served in the 71st, 72nd, 73rd, 74th, 75th, 76th, 77th, and 78th Minnesota Legislatures. In 1990, Haukoos was a co-sponsor of a legislative bill renaming Helmer Myre State Park based on Albert Lea Lake as Myre-Big Island State Park.
Haukoos helped pass a law on Airplane Frequent Flyer Benefits that makes the frequent-flyer miles accrued belong to the purchaser of the ticket, which, in some cases, is the state or other governmental unit.  As fiscal conservative, Haukoos opposed the state increasing staffing at rest areas. Instead, He sponsored a bill that allowed the state to take bids on installing the kiosks containing both information for travelers and advertising. The company would sell the ad space and the state would receive part of the revenue. In the 76th Legislative Session, Haukoos strongly opposed a proposal to allow only video gambling in bars and restaurants and eliminate paper pulltabs because it could have caused job layoffs for a local Albert Lea company that produces paper pulltabs.

Post-legislative career
After the Legislature he worked as field representative for 1st District U.S. Representative Gil Gutknecht and enjoyed camaraderie with former colleagues during a term as Master at Arms for the Minnesota House of Representatives. Haukoos served a term as mayor of Albert Lea during 2001-2002. During his term as Mayor, the meat-packaging plant Farmstead caught fire and burned down. After almost 15 years, the city has yet to do anything with the land.

Personal life
Haukoos married his wife Grace McNeil on July 28, 1955 and lived in Albert Lea, Minnesota. Haukoos and his wife had 2 children: Miriam and Robert and had 3 grandchildren from Robert.
He was a dedicated and faithful public servant, giving his time and energy to many public causes. For 20 years he was a member of the board of the American Lung Association of Minnesota. At various times he served on the boards of Naeve Hospital, the National Guard Advisory Committee, the Chamber of Commerce Foundation, the City of Albert Lea Housing and Redevelopment Authority and numerous other organizations. He was a long time member of Golden Kiwanis, the VFW, the American Legion and the Sons of Norway.
For more than 50 years, Haukoos was an active member of the First Baptist Church, including service as treasurer, usher, and member of the Board of Deacons.  Haukoos is also related to former Minnesota Congressman Tim Penny.

Death
Haukoos died at his home in Albert Lea, Minnesota on the morning of September 10, 2011, after dealing with congestive heart disease for many years. His funeral was held at the First Baptist Church in Albert Lea, Minnesota. He was buried in Graceland Cemetery.

References

External links 

1931 births
2011 deaths
People from Faribault County, Minnesota
Republican Party members of the Minnesota House of Representatives
People from Albert Lea, Minnesota
Military personnel from Minnesota
American firefighters